Richard Herbert is a Welsh former professional darts player who competed in British Darts Organisation events.

Career

Herbert played in the 1994 BDO World Darts Championship but lost in the first round to fellow Welshman Martin Phillips. Herbert never returned to Lakeside, but played in the Winmau World Masters three times. His first appearance came in 1997, beating Sweden's Stefan Nagy and Welshman Marshall James to reach the quarter finals, losing to Ronnie Baxter. He returned to the Masters in 2001 and 2002, but suffered early exits in both years, losing to Wayne Mardle and Alan Reynolds. He also Captained Wales during the late 1990s.

Herbert died in 2012

World Championship results

BDO

 1994: 1st Round (lost to Martin Phillips 2–3) (sets)

References

External links
 Profile at Darts Database

Welsh darts players
Year of birth missing
British Darts Organisation players